The Southland Bowling League (SBL) is a National Collegiate Athletic Association (NCAA) bowling-only conference. The SBL was founded in 2015 for schools that sponsor women's bowling teams, but do not have bowling sponsored by their primary conferences. The SBL champion has received an automatic bid to the NCAA Bowling Championship since the NCAA first awarded such bids in 2018. While the conference operates independently, administrative services are provided by the Southland Conference.

The SBL has received at least three bids to the NCAA Championship in each season since it began play in 2015. Following the inaugural SBL Championship, four league teams (Arkansas State, Sam Houston State, Stephen F. Austin, and Vanderbilt) received at-large bids to the 2015 NCAA Championships, filling half of the eight available spots. The same four teams would receive at-large bids to the 2016 NCAA Bowling Championships and 2017 NCAA Bowling Championships. In 2018, the first year for automatic bids to the NCAA Championship and also the first year for a 10-team championship event, Vanderbilt earned the automatic bid and Arkansas State and Sam Houston State received at-large bids. In 2019, Sam Houston State earned the automatic bid, while Arkansas State, Stephen F. Austin, and Vanderbilt received at-large bids. In 2021, Vanderbilt earned the automatic bid, while Arkansas State, Louisiana Tech, Sam Houston State, and Youngstown State received at-large bids. In 2022, six of the eight members made the NCAA Bowling Championships field with Vanderbilt earning the automatic bid, while Arkansas State, Louisiana Tech, Sam Houston State, Stephen F. Austin, and Youngstown State all receiving at-large bids.

In July 2021, it was announced that Sam Houston and Stephen F. Austin left the Southland for the Western Athletic Conference. After the two schools announced they would join the WAC in fall 2022, they were expelled by the Southland Conference and joined the WAC a year ahead of the originally planned schedule. Despite leaving the Southland Conference in all other sports, Sam Houston and Stephen F. Austin remained in the SBL and both participated in the 2022 SBL Bowling Championships.

Members 

On August 7, 2018, Southland Bowling League and Youngstown State University announced that Youngstown State's bowling program was joining the league for competition beginning in the 2018–2019 season. Youngstown State replaces Monmouth, who accepted an invitation to join the MEAC.

Notes

Former members

SBL Championship

All-Tournament Teams

NCAA Bowling Championship participation
Source:

Arkansas State – 2008 Runner-up, 2009, 2010, 2011, 2012, 2013, 2014, 2015, 2016, 2017, 2018, 2019, 2021 Runner-up, 2022

Louisiana Tech – 2021, 2022

Sam Houston State – 2011, 2013, 2014 Champion, 2015, 2016, 2017, 2018, 2019, 2021, 2022

Stephen F. Austin – 2015 Runner-up, 2016 Champion, 2017, 2019 Champion, 2022 Runner-up

Valparaiso – 2012

Vanderbilt – 2006, 2007 Champion, 2008, 2009, 2010, 2011 Runner-up, 2012, 2013 Runner-up, 2014, 2015, 2016, 2017, 2018 Champion, 2019 Runner-up, 2021, 2022

Youngstown State – 2021, 2022

See also
NCAA Bowling Championship

References

Ten-pin bowling competitions in the United States
NCAA conferences
Southland Conference
2015 establishments in Texas